Kayıp Çocuk Masalları (Missing Children's Tales) is a 2010 Turkish studio album by Cem Adrian.

Background
The album is Adrian's 5th alternative rock music studio album after Emir which was released 2.5 years prior.

Track listing

Production 
Words, music, vocals, arranging: Cem Adrian
Guest artists: Aylin Aslım, Murat Yılmazyıldırım
Album cover: Boğaç Dalkıran

References

External links
Kayıp Çocuk Masalları at iTunes
Kayıp Çocuk Masalları at Spotify

Cem Adrian albums
2010 albums